Arwel (pronounced ) is a Welsh given name. Notable persons with this name include:

Arwel Hughes (1909–1988), Welsh orchestral conductor and composer
Arwel Richards (born 1982), Welsh polo administrator and columnist
Arwel Robson (born 1997), Welsh rugby union player
Arwel Thomas (born 1974), Wales international rugby union player
Owain Arwel Hughes (born 1942), Welsh orchestral conductor

Welsh masculine given names